Tomas Kalinauskas (born 27 April 2000) is a Lithuanian professional footballer who plays as a attacking midfielder for FC Den Bosch.

Club career
Kalinauskas spent seven years with the Conquest Football Academy in London before turning professional in July 2021 with Barnsley. He also spent time in non-league football alongside his time at Conquest, playing with Hayes & Yeading United and Farnborough.

He moved on loan to AFC Wimbledon in January 2022, and on loan to Havant & Waterlooville in August 2022.

On 17 January 2023, he signed for Dutch Eerste Divisie club FC Den Bosch.

International career
Kalinauskas is a Lithuanian youth international, representing them at under-19 and under-21 levels.

He made his debut for the Lithuania national football team on 25 September 2022 in a Nations League game against Luxembourg.

References

External links

2000 births
Living people
Lithuanian footballers
Association football midfielders
English Football League players
National League (English football) players
Hayes & Yeading United F.C. players
Farnborough F.C. players
Barnsley F.C. players
AFC Wimbledon players
Havant & Waterlooville F.C. players
FC Den Bosch players
Lithuania youth international footballers
Lithuania under-21 international footballers
Lithuania international footballers
Lithuanian expatriate footballers
Lithuanian expatriate sportspeople in England
Expatriate footballers in England
Lithuanian expatriate sportspeople in the Netherlands
Expatriate footballers in the Netherlands
Eerste Divisie players